The Mayor of Cumberland, Maryland is the chief executive of the government of Cumberland, as stipulated by the city Charter.

Mayors of Cumberland, Maryland (1816-present):

 (01) 1816–1823:  John Scott 
 (02) 1823–1824: Samuel Magill established the first newspaper in Cumberland the Allegany Freeman published weekly from 1813 to 1816 (See, Lowdermilk, page 301)
 (03) 1824–1835: Roger Perry 
 (04) 1835–1836: John Gephart 
 (05) 1836–1837:  John Write 
 (06) 1837–1838: Gustavus Beall 
 (07) 1838–1839: Frederick Deems 
 (08) 1839–1841: Samuel Charles 
 (09) 1841–1842:  James Smith 
 (10) 1842–1843: John Gephart 
 (11) 1843–1849: Thomas Shriver 
 (12) 1849–1850: Thomas F. White 
 (13) 1850–1851: Thomas Shriver 
 (14) 1851–1852: Daniel Saylor 
 (15) 1852–1853:  John Hayes 
 (16) 1853–1854: Fayette Bartholomew Tower 
 (17) 1854–1855: A. L. Withers 
 (18) 1855–1856: William Wallace McKaig 
 (19) 1856–1857: Joseph H. Tucker 
 (20) 1857–1858: James W. Jones 
 (21) 1858–1860: D. W. McCleary 
 (22) 1860–1861: John Humbird 
 (23) 1861–1862: Charles Mynn Thruston 
 (24) 1862–1863: Charles H. Ohr 
 (25) 1863–1864: James Smith 
 (26) 1864–1865: Charles H. Ohr 
 (27) 1865–1866: George Harrison 
 (28) 1866–1869: John Humbird 
 (29) 1869–1871: Lloyd Lowe 
 (30) 1871–1872: William Piatt 
 (31) 1872–1873: John B. Widener 
 (32) 1873–1874: William A. Withers 
 (33) 1874–1874: William R. McCulley 
 (34) 1874–1876: John Humbird 
 (35) 1876–1877: William A. Withers 
 (36) 1890–1890: William McMahon McKaig 
 (37) 1891–1891: David J. Blackiston
 (38) 1900–1904: Warren C. White 
 (39) 1904–1905: Clarence M. King 
 (40) 1905–1906: William A. Cromwell 
 (41) 1906–1908: Clarence M. King 
 (42) 1908–1910: George A. Kean 
 (43) 1910–1914: George A. Young 
 (44) 1914–1932: Thomas W. Koon 
 (45) 1932–1934:  George Henderson 
 (46) 1934–1936: George W. Legge 
 (47) 1936–1939: Thomas W. Koon 
 (48) 1939–1942: Harry Irvine 
 (49) 1942–1944: Thomas F. Conlon 
 (50) 1944–1952: Thomas S. Post 
 (51) 1952–1958: Roy W. Eves 
 (52) 1958–1962: J. Edwin Keech 
 (53) 1962–1966: Earl D. Chaney 
 (54) 1966–1974: Thomas F. Conlon, Jr. 
 (55) 1974–1978: F. Perry Smith, Jr. 
 (56) 1978–1982: Frank K. Nethken 
 (57) 1982–1988: George M. Wyckoff, Jr. 
 (58) 1988–1992: Harry Stern
 (59) 1992–2000: Edward C. Athey 
 (60) 2000–2011: Lee N. Fiedler
 (61) 2011-2019: Brian K. Grim
 (62) 2019-Present: Raymond Morriss

Cumberland, Maryland